Kuppali Venkatappa Puttappa (29 December 1904 – 11 November 1994), popularly known by his pen name Kuvempu, was an Indian poet, playwright, novelist and critic. He is widely regarded as the greatest Kannada poet of the 20th century. He was the first Kannada writer to receive the Jnanpith Award.

Kuvempu studied at Mysuru University in the 1920s, taught there for nearly three decades and served as its vice-chancellor from 1956 to 1960. He initiated education in Kannada as the language medium. For his contributions to Kannada Literature, the Government of Karnataka decorated him with the honorific Rashtrakavi ("National Poet") in 1964 and Karnataka Ratna ("The Gem of Karnataka") in 1992. He was conferred the Padma Vibhushan by the Government of India in 1988. He penned the Karnataka State Anthem Jaya Bharata Jananiya Tanujate.

Biography

Early life and education 

Kuvempu was born in Hirekodige, a village in Koppa taluk of Chikmagalur district and raised in Kuppalli, a village in Shivamogga district of the erstwhile Kingdom of Mysore (now in Karnataka) into to a Kannada-speaking Vokkaliga family. His mother Seethamma hailed from Koppa, Chikmagalur, while his father Venkatappa was from Kuppali, a village in 
Thirthahalli taluk (in present-day Shimoga district), where he was raised. Early in his childhood, Kuvempu was home-schooled by an appointed teacher from South Canara. He joined the Anglo-Vernacular school in Thirthahalli to continue his middle school education. Kuvempu's father died when he was only twelve. He finished his lower and secondary education in Kannada and English languages in Thirthahalli and moved to Mysore for further education at the Wesleyan High School. Thereafter, he pursued college studies at the Maharaja College of Mysore and graduated in 1929, majoring in Kannada.

Family 

Kuvempu married Hemavathi on 30 April 1937. He was forced into enter marital life on this faculty out of Ramakrishna Mission. Kuvempu has two sons, Poornachandra Tejaswi and Kokilodaya Chaitra, and two daughter, Indukala and Tharini. Tharini is married to K.Chidananda Gowda the former Vice-Chancellor of Kuvempu University. His home in Mysore is called Udayaravi. His son Poornachandra Tejaswi was a polymath, contributing significantly to Kannada literature, photography, calligraphy, digital imaging, social movements, and agriculture.

Career 
Kuvempu began his academic career as a lecturer of Kannada language at the Maharaja's College in Mysore in 1929. He worked as an assistant professor in the Central college, Bangalore from 1936. He re-joined Maharaja's college in Mysore in 1946 as a professor.  He went on to become the principal of the Maharaja's college in 1955. In 1956 he was selected as the Vice-Chancellor of Mysore University where he served till retirement in 1960. He was the first graduate from Mysore University to rise to that position.

Bibliography

Epic 

 Sri Ramayana Darshanam/ಶ್ರೀ ರಾಮಾಯಣ ದರ್ಶನಂ - Volume-01 (1949), Volume-02 (1957)
 Chitrangada/ಚಿತ್ರಾಂಗದಾ

Novels 

 Kaanuru Heggaditi/ಕಾನೂರು ಹೆಗ್ಗಡಿತಿ (1936)
 Malegalalli Madumagalu/ಮಲೆಗಳಲ್ಲಿ ಮದುಮಗಳು (1967)

Plays 

 Birugaali/ಬಿರುಗಾಳಿ (1930)
 Maharaatri/ಮಹಾರಾತ್ರಿ (1931)
 Smashana Kurukshethra/ಸ್ಮಶಾನ ಕುರುಕ್ಷೇತ್ರ (1931)
 Jalagaara/ಜಲಗಾರ (1931)
 Raktaakshi/ರಕ್ತಾಕ್ಷಿ (1932)
 Shoodra Tapaswi/ಶೂದ್ರ ತಪಸ್ವಿ (1944)
 Beralge koral/ಬೆರಳ್ಗೆ ಕೊರಳ್ (1947)
 Yamana solu/ಯಮನ ಸೇೂಲು
 Chandrahasa/ಚಂದ್ರಹಾಸ
 Balidaana/ಬಲಿದಾನ
 Kaaneena/ಕಾನೀನ (1974)

Autobiography 

 Nenapina Doniyali/ನೆನಪಿನ ದೇೂಣಿಯಲಿ (1980)

Collection of stories 
 Sanyaasi Mattu Itare Kathegalu / ಸನ್ಯಾಸಿ ಮತ್ತು ಇತರೆ ಕಥೆಗಳು (1937)
 Nanna Devaru Mattu Itare Kathegalu / ನನ್ನ ದೇವರು ಮತ್ತು ಇತರೆ ಕಥೆಗಳು (1940)

Essays 
 Malenaadina Chittragalu / ಮಲೆನಾಡಿನ ಚಿತ್ರಗಳು (1933)

Literary criticism 

 Atmashreegagi Nirankushamatigalagi (1944)
 Kavyavihara (1946)
 Taponandana (1951)
 Vibhuthi Pooje / ವಿಭೂತಿ ಪೂಜೆ (1953)
 Draupadiya Shrimudi (1960)
 Vicharakrantige Ahvana (1976)
 Sahityaprachara
 Ithyadi
 Raso Vai Saha

Essay and Other 
 Manujamatha Viswapatha
 Kavya Vihara
 Mantramangalya

Biography 

 Swami Vivekananda (1932)
 Sri Ramakrishna Paramahamsa (1934)

Translation 

 Guruvinodane Devaredege
 Janapriya Valmiki Ramayana

Stories and poems for children 

 Bommanahalliya kindarijogi(1936)
 Mari vijnani(1947)
 Meghapura (1947)
 Nanna mane (1947)
 Nanna gopala
 Amalana kathe
 Sahasa pavana
 Modannana Tamma
 Narigaligeke Kodilla
 Haluru

Poetry 
 Kolalu (1930)
 Panchajanya (1933)
 Navilu (1934)
 Kalasundari (1934)
 Kathana Kavanagalu (1937)
 Kogile Matthu Soviet Russia (1944)
 Prema Kashmeera (1946)
 Agnihamsa (1946)
 Krutthike (1946)
 Pakshikashi (1946)
 Kinkini (Collection of Vachana) (1946)
 Shodashi (1946)
 Chandramanchake Baa Chakori (1957)
 Ikshugangothri (1957)
 Anikethana (1963)
 Jenaguva (1964)
 Anutthara (1965)
 Manthrakshathe (1966)
 Kadaradake (1967)
 Prethakyoo (1967)
 Kuteechaka (1967)
 Honna Hotthaare (1976)
 Koneya Thene Matthu Vishwamanava Sandesha (1981)

Movies 
 Kanooru Heggadithi (directed by Girish Karnad).

Drama 
 Malegaladalli Madumagalu (directed by Basavalingaiah)

Awards and honours
 Karnataka Ratna (1992)
 Padma Vibhushan (1988)
 Pampa Award (1987)
 Jnanpith Award (1967)
 Rashtrakavi ("National Poet") (1964)
 Padma Bhushan (1958)
 Sahitya Akademi Award (1955)
 To landmark the golden jubilee of Kannada's first Jnanapeeth award, on 29 December 2017, Kuvempu's 113th birth anniversary, Google India dedicated a Google Doodle in his honor.

Memorials

Kavimane — Kuvempu Memorial 

The childhood home of Kuvempu at Kuppali has been converted into a museum by Rashtrakavi Kuvempu Pratishtana (a trust dedicated to Kuvempu). This trust has undertaken immense developmental works in Kuppali to showcase Kuvempu and his works to the external world. On 23 November 2015 night, many valuables including the Padma Shri and Padma Bhushan awards conferred on poet laureate Kuvempu were stolen from Kavimane.

The entire museum has been ransacked. The surveillance cameras there have also been damaged. The Jnanapith award kept there has remained intact..

Kavishaila
The gradually rising hill south of the house is named Kavishaila, Kuvempu's mortal remains were placed at Kavishaila.

Biographies on Kuvempu 

 Annana Nenapu, Poornachandra Tejaswi
 Yugada Kavi, K.C. Shiva Reddy
 Kuvempu, Pradhan Gurudatta
 Magalu Kanda Kuvempu, Tharini Chidananda,

Commemoration

The Kuvempu University in Shimoga, Karnataka was established in 1987. The Vishwamanava Express was named in honour of Kuvempu's idea of "Vishwa Manava" ("Universal Man").

India Post honoured Kuvempu by releasing a postage stamp in 1997 and 2017.

See also 
 List of Indian writers
 Kannada language
 Kannada literature
 Kannada poetry
 Rashtrakavi - list of poets who have borne the title.

References

Further reading

External links 

 Project Kuvempu
 Kuvempu Picture Album at Kamat's Potpourri
 Kuvempu Page at NIC Shimoga

1904 births
1994 deaths
Recipients of the Jnanpith Award
Recipients of the Karnataka Ratna
Kannada-language writers
Kannada poets
Recipients of the Padma Bhushan in literature & education
Recipients of the Padma Vibhushan in literature & education
Translators of the Ramayana
Writers from Mysore
People from Chikkamagaluru
Kannada people
Indian socialists
Recipients of the Sahitya Akademi Award in Kannada
University of Mysore alumni
Maharaja's College, Mysore alumni
Heads of universities and colleges in India
Rashtrakavi